National Highway 167A, commonly called NH 167A is a national highway in  India. It is a spur road of National Highway 167. NH-167A traverses the state of Andhra Pradesh in India.

Route 
AP/Telangana border (Pondugala), Piduguralla, Narsaraopet, Chilakaluripet, Chirala, Vodarevu

Junctions  
 
Junction with National Highway 216 near Chirala.

See also 
List of National Highways in India by highway number

References

External links 

 NH 167A on OpenStreetMap

National highways in India
National Highways in Andhra Pradesh